Joshua Goss (born August 16, 1994) is an American soccer player who plays as a midfielder. He most recently played for USL Championship team New Mexico United.

Playing career 
Goss attended the University of New Mexico, appearing 67 times and scoring 2 goals for the program across four seasons. While in college, he also played one season with Burlingame Dragons FC in the USL Professional Development League.

In 2017, Goss signed with Colorado Rapids U-23, making 12 league appearances scoring 4 goals, both single-season career highs. He played with Albuquerque Sol during the 2018 season.

On February 21, 2019, Goss signed for USL Championship expansion team New Mexico United. There he operated as a squad player, appearing twice in the team's inaugural season. Goss did not return for the 2020 season, being left out of the club's final roster. As of December 13, 2020, Goss has not joined another team.

Career statistics

References

External links
Profile at University of New Mexico Athletics

1994 births
Living people
New Mexico Lobos men's soccer players
Burlingame Dragons FC players
Colorado Rapids U-23 players
Albuquerque Sol FC players
New Mexico United players
USL League Two players
USL Championship players
American soccer players
Association football midfielders
Soccer players from Albuquerque, New Mexico